Major-General Francis William Ward  (1840–1919) was Master Gunner, St James's Park, the most senior Ceremonial Post in the Royal Artillery after the Sovereign.

Military career
Ward was born in 1840, the son of John Ward. He was educated at the East India Company's Military College at Addiscombe in 1856–7, before entering the Bengal Artillery. He then served during the Indian Mutiny of 1857. He was appointed a Lieutenant in the Royal Bengal Artillery in 1862.

He served on the North West Frontier from 1863 to 1864 and took part in the Second Anglo-Afghan War from 1879 to 1880. He later became a Colonel on the Staff Commanding the Royal Artillery in the Punjab. He rose through the officer ranks and became a major general in 1895.

He was made Colonel Commandant of the Royal Artillery on 1 May 1902 and then held the position of Master Gunner, St James's Park immediately after World War I.

He died in 1919 in London, England.

Family
He married Alice MacMullen, daughter of General S. F. MacMullen of the Bengal Cavalry in 1862.

References

British Army generals
Companions of the Order of the Bath
Graduates of Addiscombe Military Seminary
Royal Artillery officers
1840 births
1919 deaths
Bengal Artillery officers
British military personnel of the Indian Rebellion of 1857
British military personnel of the Second Anglo-Afghan War